Volunteer Functions Inventory (VFI) is a research method for assessing volunteer motivations. The model has been developed by Clary et al. in 1998.

Assumptions 

 People are purposeful, planful, goal-directed—Volunteers engage in volunteer work in order to satisfy important personal goals
 Different people may do similar things for different reasons—Volunteers performing the same volunteer activity for the same organization may have different reasons for volunteering
 Any one individual may be motivated by more than one need or goal—An individual volunteer may be attempting to satisfy two or more motives through one activity at your organization
 Outcomes depend on the matching of needs and goals to the opportunities afforded by the environment – Successful volunteer recruitment, satisfaction, and retention is tied to the ability of the volunteer experience to fulfil the volunteer's important motives

Motivations for volunteering

Findings 
Having analyzed several dozens of studies using this framework, Chacón et al. found that the most common motivation for volunteering is the values dimension, and the least, career and enhancement ones. Career and understanding motivations decrease with the mean age of volunteers, and men seem to be more likely to consider the social dimension than women.

References 

Volunteering